Vitex negundo, commonly known as the Chinese chaste tree, five-leaved chaste tree, or horseshoe vitex, or nisinda  is a large aromatic shrub with quadrangular, densely whitish, tomentose branchlets. It is widely used in folk medicine, particularly in South and Southeast Asia.

The bark is reddish brown. Its leaves are digitate, with five lanceolate leaflets, sometimes three. The leaf edges are toothed or serrated and the bottom surface is covered in hair.
The numerous flowers are borne in panicles  in length. The petals are of different lengths, with the middle lower lobe being the longest. Both the corolla and calyx are covered in dense hairs.

The fruit is a succulent drupe,  in diameter, rounded to egg-shaped. It is black or purple when ripe.

Distribution and habitat
Vitex negundo is native to tropical Eastern and Southern Africa and Asia. It is widely cultivated and naturalized elsewhere.

Countries it is indigenous to include Afghanistan, Bangladesh, Bhutan, Cambodia, China, India, Indonesia, Japan, Korea, Kenya, Madagascar, Malaysia, Mozambique, Myanmar, Nepal, Pakistan, the Philippines, Sri Lanka, Taiwan, Tanzania, Thailand, and Vietnam.

Vitex negundo are commonly found near bodies of water, recently disturbed land, grasslands, and mixed open forests.

Nomenclature
Common names of Vitex negunda in different languages include:

Assamese: Posotiya (পচতীয়া)
Bengali: Nirgundi; Nishinda; Samalu
Bontok: Liñgei
Chinese: 
English: Five-leaved chaste tree; Horseshoe vitex; Chinese chaste tree
Filipino: Lagundî
Gujarati: Nagoda; Shamalic
Hindi: Mewri; Nirgundi; Nisinda; Sambhalu; Sawbhalu (निर्गुंडी)
Ifugao: Dabtan
Ilokano: Dangla
Kannada: 
Korean: 
Malayalam: Karinochi (കരിനൊച്ചി)
Marathi: Nirgudi (निरगुडी)
Nepali: 'सिमली' 'Simali' 'Nirgundi'
Punjabi: Banna; Marwan; Maura; Mawa; Swanjan Torbanna
Sanskrit: Nirgundi; Sephalika; Sindhuvara; Svetasurasa; Vrikshaha (सिन्धुवार)
Sinhala: Nika (නික)
Konkani: Lingad
Tamil: Chinduvaram; Nirnochchi; Nochchi; Notchi; Vellai-nochchi (நொச்சி / கரு நொச்சி)
Telugu: Sindhuvara; Vavili; Nalla-vavili; Tella-vavili (వావిలి / సింధువార) lekkali

Urdu: Sumbaloo
Odia: Begunia

Chemistry
The principal constituents of the leaf juice are casticin, isoorientin, chrysophenol D, luteolin, p–hydroxybenzoic acid and D-fructose.  The main constituents of the oil are sabinene, linalool, terpinen-4-ol, β-caryophyllene, α-guaiene and globulol constituting 61.8% of the oil.

Uses
Purified extracts are believed to have medicinal properties.

Vitex negundo is used for treating stored garlic against pests and as a cough remedy in the Philippines, sold under the trade names Ascof and Plemex. In Malaysia, it is used in traditional herbal medicine for women's health, including treatments for regulating the menstrual cycle, fibrocystic breast disease and post-partum remedies.

References

External links
 Contains a detailed monograph on Vitex negundo (Nirgundi) as well as a discussion of health benefits and usage in clinical practice. Available online at https://web.archive.org/web/20110403032108/http://www.toddcaldecott.com/index.php/herbs/learning-herbs/315-nirgundi

negundo
Plants used in Ayurveda
Flora of the Philippines
Plants described in 1753
Taxa named by Carl Linnaeus
kn:ಲಕ್ಕಿ ಗಿಡ
ml:കരിനൊച്ചി
ne:सिमाली
sa:निर्गुण्डिसस्यम्
te:వావిలి